Embarcadero West, also known as 275 Battery Street, is a 30-story,  office skyscraper in the Financial District of San Francisco, California. The building is part of the Embarcadero Center, which is a complex of five office towers and two hotels. The skyscraper, which was completed in 1989, is not connected physically to the other buildings.

History 
TIAA-CREF sold the building to Rockpoint Group in October 2014 for around $307 million.

Tenants 
 Consulate General of Japan
 Crowell & Moring
 Gordon & Rees
 Lieff Cabraserref></ref>
 Squire Patton Boggs

See also
 San Francisco's tallest buildings

References

External links
 Embarcadero Center official web site

Skyscraper office buildings in San Francisco
John C. Portman Jr. buildings
Financial District, San Francisco
Office buildings completed in 1989